Christian C. Sam (born June 7, 1996) is an American football linebacker who is a free agent. He played college football at Arizona State, in 2017 leading the Pac-12 with 127 tackles, while also leading the Pac-12 with 87 solo tackles (4th-most in the NCAA). He has been a member of the New England Patriots, Miami Dolphins, San Francisco 49ers, Detroit Lions, Tampa Bay Bandits, and New Orleans Breakers.

Early years
Sam is a native of Allen, Texas, a northern suburb of Dallas, and is of Nigerian descent. His father is Prince Christian Sam and his mother is Veronica, and he is the youngest of four children.  His brother Prince played cornerback for the Bulldogs football team at Louisiana Tech.

High school
Sam attended Allen High School ('14) in Allen, Texas, where he played opposite high school quarterback Kyler Murray, and led the Allen Eagles football team to the Texas 5A Division I State Championships in 2012 and 2013. 
He was named the Defensive MVP of the 2013 Texas state championship game after tallying 5.5 tackles, a sack, and a forced fumble. That season he was also named 10-5A First Team All-District. Rivals.com rated him the No. 27 linebacker recruit in the nation, and almost every major recruiting service considered him a three-star recruit.

College career

Sam committed to play football for the Arizona State Sun Devils in August 2013. He chose the Sun Devils over nearly 20 other schools, incluidng Oklahoma, Baylor, and Texas Tech. The Sun Devils primarily used him as an inside linebacker, though he did also play snaps as an off-the-line outside linebacker and as an edge rusher.

As a true freshman in 2014, Sam played in all 13 of Arizona State's games. He tallied 16 tackles, one interception, one sack, and one pass deflection.

In 2015, as a sophomore, Sam became a full-time starter and once again appeared in all 13 of the team's games, posting 98 tackles (7th in the Pac-12; 6.5 for loss), including 68 solo tackles (5th in the Pac-12), one interception, three sacks, two pass deflections, and two forced fumbles (6th in the Pac-12).

Sam suffered a season-ending high right ankle injury in Arizona State's first game of the 2016 season. He elected to take a medical redshirt.

As a redshirt junior in 2017, Sam played in 12 games. He led the Pac-12 with 127 tackles, while also leading the Pac-12 with 87 solo tackles (4th-most in the NCAA). He also tallied one interception, 9.5 tackles for loss, three sacks, one pass deflection, and one forced fumble. He was named First Team All-League by the Associated Press, and Honorable Mention All-Pac-12. After the season, he declared for the 2018 NFL Draft.

Professional career

At the NFL Scouting Combine, he had 28 reps in the 225-pound (102-kg) bench press, the most of anyone at the position. Sports analyst Lance Zierlein wrote: "he has enough talent to become a solid NFL backup who can step into starting reps if needed." Scouts remarked on his "active athleticism." Coach and ASU defensive coordinator Phil Benett said: "He’s definitely an NFL guy ... he’s playing with speed, he’s playing with physicality. He does multiple skills; he stops the run, he tackles well, he blitzes, and he covers.”

New England Patriots
The New England Patriots selected Sam in the sixth round (178th overall) of the 2018 NFL Draft on April 28, 2018. He left ASU with a year of eligibility remaining, though he had graduated early and already earned his diploma. 

On September 1, 2018, after playing three preseason games in which he had 12 tackles and an interception, Sam was placed on the team's injured reserve list at the end of preseason during the team's Super Bowl LIII season. A year later he was released during final roster cuts on August 30, 2019.

Miami Dolphins
On September 2, 2019, Sam was signed to the Miami Dolphins practice squad. He was released on September 11.

San Francisco 49ers
On November 5, 2019, Sam was signed to the San Francisco 49ers practice squad. He was released on December 10, 2019.

Detroit Lions
On December 17, 2019, Sam was signed to the Detroit Lions practice squad. On December 30, 2019, Sam was signed to a reserve/future contract. He was waived on August 9, 2020.

Tampa Bay Bandits
Sam was selected in the 21st round of the 2022 USFL Draft by the Tampa Bay Bandits. He was released on June 7, 2022.

New Orleans Breakers
Sam was claimed off waivers by the New Orleans Breakers on the same day, June 7, 2022. He played in nine games for the Breakers, and had 54 total tackles, eight tackles for loss, and an interception.

Dallas Cowboys
On July 8, 2022, Sam signed with the Dallas Cowboys. He was waived/injured reserve on August 23, 2022 and placed on injured reserve. He was released on August 25.

References

External links
Instagram page
Arizona State Sun Devils football bio
New England Patriots bio
 Justin Melo (April 18, 2018). "Meet Christian Sam, the relentless gem of the 2018 LB class," USA Today (interview).

1996 births
Living people
American football linebackers
American sportspeople of Nigerian descent
Arizona State Sun Devils football players
Dallas Cowboys players
Detroit Lions players
Miami Dolphins players
New England Patriots players
New Orleans Breakers (2022) players
People from Allen, Texas
Players of American football from Texas
San Francisco 49ers players
Sportspeople from the Dallas–Fort Worth metroplex
Tampa Bay Bandits (2022) players